Edna Woods (born August 23, 1949), also known as LeJeune Richardson, is an American singer, dancer and actress. She was an Ikette in the Ike & Tina Turner Revue in the 1960s and 1970s, and later a dancer for Tina Turner in the 1980s and 1990s. Richardson was a backing vocalist for Gayle McCormick and John Mayall. She was also a member of the vocal group Silver, Platinum & Gold.

Life and career 
Richardson was born Edna Woods on August 23, 1949 in Akron, Ohio. As a teenager she worked as a beautician and sang gospel. Richardson got her professional start as a singer in the group Soul Sensations. Richardson joined the Ike & Tina Turner Revue an Ikette in 1968. As an Ikette, Richardson toured the world and appeared on various television shows, including The Hollywood Palace, The Smothers Brothers Comedy Hour, Soul Train, The Dick Cavett Show, The Midnight Special, Cher, and Don Kirshner's Rock Concert.

In the mid 1970s Richardson pursued a career in film. As an actress she has credited roles in Truck Turner (1974) and Darktown Strutters (1975).

After the dissolution of the Ike & Tina Turner Revue in 1976, Richardson recorded an album as part of the vocal trio Silver, Platinum & Gold. The group consisted of Richardson, Renee King and Flo King, who were also former backing vocalists. They released a self-titled album on Farr Records in late 1976. Richardson co-wrote seven songs on the album. The single "Just Friends" reached No. 63 on the Billboard R&B chart. The group toured with Wild Cherry in 1976. They released another album, Hollywood, on Neptune Records in 1981.

Richardson joined Tina Turner during her solo career as a dancer in 1980. By then she began going by the name LeJeune Richardson. Richardson appeared in Turner's music videos "Let's Stay Together" (1983) and "Help!" (1984). She toured with Turner on-and-off until her Foreign Affair World Tour in 1990.

She was married to Kings of Rhythm drummer Soko Richardson.

Discography

Silver, Platinum & Gold albums 

 1976: Silver, Platinum & Gold
 1981: Hollywood

Backing vocal credits 

 1972: Gayle McCormick – Flesh & Blood
 1977: John Mayall – A Hard Core Package

Filmography

References

External links 

 
 Edna Richardson on AllMovie
 

1949 births
Living people
Musicians from Akron, Ohio
Actresses from Akron, Ohio
Songwriters from Ohio
Ike & Tina Turner members
African-American women singers
American rhythm and blues singers
American soul singers
American film actresses
Singers from Ohio
African-American songwriters